Gongzhou or Gong Prefecture (龔州) was a zhou (prefecture) in imperial China centering on modern Pingnan County, Guangxi, China. It existed (intermittently) from 633 to 1136.

References
 

Prefectures of Southern Han
Prefectures of the Tang dynasty
Guangnan West Circuit
Prefectures of Ma Chu
Former prefectures in Guangxi